Sarah-Jane Duncanson "Trinny" Woodall (born 8 February 1964) is a British beauty entrepreneur, businesswoman, fashion and makeover expert, television presenter and author.

Woodall initially rose to fame as part of a makeover duo with Susannah Constantine, with whom she teamed up to write a weekly fashion column for The Daily Telegraph. They were then commissioned by the BBC to host What Not to Wear in 2001, which was followed by several other television projects, books and clothing ranges.

In 2017, Woodall launched her direct-to-consumer beauty brand, Trinny London, which currently employs over 190 people.

Career

Early career
Woodall and Susannah Constantine first collaborated in 1996 on Ready to Wear, a weekly style guide for The Daily Telegraph which ran for seven years. The style guide highlighted affordable high-street fashion, with the pair using themselves to demonstrate clothing that suited different figures.  Woodall assumed the role of stylist and made the duo's business decisions.

Television 
Woodall and Constantine became household names as co-hosts and fashion advisors for five series of the BBC television series What Not to Wear. They combined their fashion knowledge and their infamous straight-talking advice to improve the dress sense of the candidates selected for the show.

In 2002, Woodall and Constantine won a Royal Television Society Award for their work on What Not to Wear, in the category of best factual presenter. The show itself was nominated for the Features Award at the BAFTAS in both 2002 and 2003.

With What Not to Wear proving popular on BBC America, they frequently contributed as makeover and fashion experts on The Oprah Winfrey Show.

After What Not to Wear, Woodall and Constantine transferred from the BBC to ITV, and Constantine began their new television show, Trinny & Susannah Undress..., in 2006. 

Woodall has also made regular appearances giving fashion and beauty advice on shows such as This Morning, The Today Show and The Marilyn Denis Show.

Books
Woodall and Constantine have co-written numerous fashion advice books, which have sold over 3 million copies worldwide. Their books have been translated throughout the world  and have placed them number one on both The Sunday Times best-seller list and The New York Times best-seller list.

Trinny London
In 2017, Woodall founded beauty brand Trinny London, which aims to help people “rethink their routine” with personalised makeup and skincare products.

Awards

Television credits

See also
Trinny and Susannah

References

External links

Trinny Woodall official website 
Trinny Woodall on Instagram
Trinny Woodall on Facebook

Trinny & Susannah Undress at itv.com
Trinny and Susannah: What They Did Next

1964 births
Living people
English television presenters
British fashion journalists
British Book Award winners
English non-fiction writers
English fashion designers
English columnists
People educated at Queen's Gate School
People from Marylebone
Fashion stylists
British women journalists
British women columnists
British women fashion designers